Phyllidia zebrina is a species of sea slug, a dorid nudibranch, a shell-less marine gastropod mollusk in the family Phyllidiidae.

Distribution 
The holotype of this species was collected at Amadaiba, Sagami Bay, Japan.

Description
This nudibranch has a translucent mantle heavily spotted with opaque white or yellow. There are a series of black (or dark red) lines radiating in from near the mantle edge towards the middle of the body. There is confusion with Phyllidia larryi.

Diet
This species feeds on a sponge.

References

Phyllidiidae
Gastropods described in 1976